The Golden Cage is a 1975 Australian film about two Turkish migrants in Australia made by the husband and wife team  and Ilhan Kuyululu. It was the first Australian film directed by a woman since the 1930s.

Production
The film was shot in March and April 1975, with the aid of $22,500 from the Film, Radio and Television Board of the Australia Council. It failed to achieve commercial distribution.

Kuyululu tried to produce a film The Battle of Broken Hill about the 1915 Battle of Broken Hill but was unable to secure finance and returned to Turkey.

Phillip Noyce worked as an assistant director on the movie.

References

External links
The Golden Cage at Australian Screen Online

The Golden Cage at Oz Movies

1975 films
Australian drama films
1970s Australian films